Steitz is a German locational surname, which originally meant a person from Steitz in Sachsen-Anhalt, Germany. The name may refer to:

Ed Steitz (1920–1990), American basketball coach
Joan A. Steitz (born 1941), American biologist
Nick Steitz (born 1982), American football player
Thomas A. Steitz (born 1940), American chemist

References

German-language surnames